Arsène Oka (born December 20, 1983) is an Ivorian footballer who currently plays for KidSuper Samba AC in the Eastern Premier Soccer League.

Career

Professional
Oka played in his native Ivory Coast for Stade d'Abidjan, Stella Club d'Adjamé and Africa Sports National, helping the latter team to the runner-up spot in the Côte d'Ivoire Premier Division in 2005 and subsequently playing in the CAF Champions League, before signing with New England Revolution of Major League Soccer in September 2006.

Having found opportunities in MLS difficult because of a persistent MCL injury, and having made just 1 senior appearance for Revolution against the Chicago Fire in his two years with the team, Oka signed with the Portland Timbers for the 2008 season, eventually featuring in 7 games and scoring 1 goal. He then signed for the newly promoted USL First Division side Cleveland City Stars for the 2009 season, and played 13 times for the team, before the club folded at the end of the season.

Having been unable to secure a professional contract elsewhere, Oka signed with Vermont Voltage of the USL Premier Development League, scoring the winning goal in their opening match of the 2010 season.

References

External links
 Cleveland City Stars bio
 Portland Timbers bio

1983 births
Living people
Expatriate soccer players in the United States
Association football midfielders
Ivorian expatriate footballers
Ivorian footballers
New England Revolution players
Footballers from Abidjan
Portland Timbers (2001–2010) players
Cleveland City Stars players
Major League Soccer players
USL First Division players
Stella Club d'Adjamé players
Vermont Voltage players
USL League Two players